Georg Christoph Strattner (c. 1645 – April 1704) was a German church musician, composer, and hymn writer.

Strattner was born in Gols, then in the Hungarian Burgenland. 
At age fourteen, he became a choir boy at the Stuttgart court chapel. In 1694, he found employment at the court chapel in Weimar and was promoted to vice capellmeister in 1695, succeeding August Kühnel, with Samuel Drese as capellmeister.

Strattner composed several cantatas of which about twenty are extant in manuscripts, and hymns, often with melodies like arias. He died in Weimar where he was buried on 11 April 1704.

Selected works 
 (ed): Joachimi Neandri Vermehrte Glaub- und Liebes-Ubung : Auffgemuntert durch einfältige Bundes-Lieder/ Und Danck-Psalmen ; Gegründet auff den zwischen Gott und dem Sünder im Blut Jesu befestigten Friedens-Schluß/ Zu lesen und zu singen auff Reisen/ Zu Hauß/ oder bey Christ-Ergetzungen im Grünen/ Durch ein geheiligtes Hertzens-Halleluja. Franckfurt: Andreä, 1691

Literature 
 
 Hermann Schemmel: Strattner, Georg Christoph. In: Wolfgang Herbst (ed.): Komponisten und Liederdichter des evangelischen Gesangbuchs. (= Handbuch zum Evangelischen Gesangbuch; vol. 2). Vandenhoeck und Ruprecht, Göttingen 1999, p. 316

External links 
 

17th-century German composers
German Protestant hymnwriters
1640s births
1704 deaths
Year of birth uncertain